The Woodsman may refer to:

 The Woodsman (2004 film), the 2004 film
 The Woodsman (2016 film), the 2016 film
 The Woodsman (play), the 2012 play
 The Woodsman (character), an Over the Garden Wall character